She-crab soup is a rich soup, similar to bisque, made of milk or heavy cream, crab or fish stock, Atlantic blue crab meat, and (traditionally) crab roe, and a small amount of dry sherry added as it is plated. It may be thickened either by heat reduction or with a purée of boiled rice; it may also include such seasonings as mace and shallots or onions.  The soup is a regional specialty from the South Carolina Lowcountry.  It is commonly featured on the menus of many Charleston, South Carolina and Savannah, Georgia restaurants.

The soup is named for the "she-crab", or female crab, originally a gravid (roe-carrying) crab, as the orange crab roe comprise a chief ingredient in traditional she-crab soup.  As with turtle soup, other ingredients may be added to the soup or substituted for others, although crabmeat is found in all versions.

Regulations in Maryland and other states restrict the collection of egg-bearing female crabs.

See also
 Partan bree
 List of cream soups
 List of regional dishes of the United States
 List of soups

References

Cream soups
Cuisine of the Southern United States
Crab dishes
Fish and seafood soups